Saint-Vigor-le-Grand is a commune in the Calvados department in the Normandy region in northwestern France.

International relations

Saint-Vigor-le-Grand is twinned with Colden Common, United Kingdom.

Population

See also
Communes of the Calvados department

References

Communes of Calvados (department)
Calvados communes articles needing translation from French Wikipedia